Cerobasis nigra is a species of Psocoptera from the Trogiidae family that is endemic to Madeira.

References

Trogiidae
Insects described in 1996
Endemic fauna of Madeira